The Cosmos Hotel is located in north-central Moscow in a green zone on one of the city's major streets, Mira Avenue, 20 minutes drive from the city centre. It is located next to the VDNKh exhibition center, close to Ostankino Telecom Tower, the Olympic Stadium and the "Sokolniki" Exhibition Complex.

Overview 
The hotel complex was built to serve the 1980 Summer Olympics held in Moscow in 1980. The building and the nearby monument "Conquerors of Space" were developed jointly by a team of Soviet and French architects: V. Andreev and T. Zaikin and  B. Steiskal of Mosproekt 1; and O. Kakub, P. Jouglet, S. Epstein of France.  Construction of buildings was a joint venture with French property company Sefri (today called Sefri Cime).

The hotel, with 1,777 rooms, is the largest hotel in Russia.

Cosmos Hotel, which is owned by Sistema, is located at Prospect Mira, 150 in Moscow.

History 
The official opening ceremony took place on 18 July 1979 and was attended by prominent politicians, businessmen, and stars of the Soviet system. Special guest singer Joe Dassin performed at the opening.

In popular culture 
The Cosmos Hotel was a location in the Russian movie Day Watch.

Footage of the Kosmos hotel was used in the BBC documentary Russia 1985–1999: TraumaZone by Adam Curtis. The running tap water was brown in colour.

References

External links

 

Hotels in Moscow
Tourist attractions in Moscow
Hotel buildings completed in 1979
Hotels established in 1979
1979 establishments in the Soviet Union
Hotels built in the Soviet Union
Buildings and structures completed in 1979